Willie Charles Hall (born September 29, 1949) is a retired American football linebacker. He played in the National Football League for the New Orleans Saints (1972-1973) and the Oakland Raiders (1975-1978).
Hall was a 2nd round selection (31st overall pick) out of the University of Southern California in the 1972 NFL Draft. Acquired by Oakland in 1975, he was a starting linebacker on the 1976 Super Bowl XI champion Raiders.

References

External links
 NFL.com player page

1949 births
Living people
People from Laurens County, Georgia
American football linebackers
USC Trojans football players
New Orleans Saints players
Oakland Raiders players
Players of American football from Georgia (U.S. state)